Ozu or Ōzu, occasionally Oozu, may refer to:

Places 

Ōzu, Ehime, a city in Ehime Prefecture
Ōzu, Kumamoto, a town in Kumamoto Prefecture
Özü Eyalet, a former eyalet in the Ottoman Empire
Ōzushima, or Ōzu Island, an island in the Seto Inland Sea in Japan

People 

Ozu Moreira (born 1986), beach soccer player
Yasujirō Ozu (1903–63), a Japanese filmmaker
Ozu, a character on the TV show Kappa Mikey

See also 
Osu (disambiguation)